Caucasorites is a genus of beetles in the family Carabidae, containing the following species:

 Caucasorites kovali Belousov, 1999
 Caucasorites shchurovi Belousov & Zamotajlov, 1997
 Caucasorites victori Belousov, 1999

References

Trechinae